Lake Sina is a lake in Douglas County, in the U.S. state of Minnesota.

Lake Sina was named after the biblical Mount Sinai.

See also
List of lakes in Minnesota

References

Lakes of Minnesota
Lakes of Douglas County, Minnesota